is a railway station on the Nippō Main Line operated by JR Kyushu in Saiki, Ōita, Japan.

Lines

Layout 
The station, which is unstaffed, consists of two side platforms serving two tracks, with a siding. The station building is a narrow simple wooden structure in a basic Japanese style with a tiled roof. There is a waiting area with seats, an automatic ticket vending machine and a ticket window area which is unstaffed. Access to the opposite platform is by means of a footbridge.

Adjacent stations

History
Japanese Government Railways opened the station on 1 July 1923 as an additional station on the existing track of its then  Hōshū Main Line, which was later renamed the Nippō Main Line on 15 December 1923. With the privatization of Japanese National Railways (JNR), the successor of JGR, on 1 April 1987, the station came under the control of JR Kyushu.

Passenger statistics
During the 2015 fiscal year, there was a total of 15,497 boarding passengers, giving a daily average of 42 passengers.

See also
List of railway stations in Japan

References

External links 

Kaizaki (JR Kyushu)

Railway stations in Ōita Prefecture
Railway stations in Japan opened in 1923